Giacomo Bertagnolli (born 18 January 1999) is a male Italian paralympic alpine skier, and is a four-time Paralympic Games gold medal winner.

Career
He won four medals at the 2018 Winter Paralympics three at the IPC Alpine Skiing World Championships.

In 2022, he won the gold medal in the men's giant slalom visually impaired alpine skiing event at the 2021 World Para Snow Sports Championships held in Lillehammer, Norway.

He won two silver medals at the 2022 Winter Paralympics, in the Super-G visually impaired and giant slalom visually impaired events held in Beijing, China.

Achievements

See also
Italy at the 2018 Winter Paralympics

References

External links
 

1999 births
Living people
Paralympic alpine skiers of Italy
Paralympic gold medalists for Italy
Paralympic silver medalists for Italy
Paralympic bronze medalists for Italy
Alpine skiers at the 2018 Winter Paralympics
Medalists at the 2018 Winter Paralympics
Alpine skiers at the 2022 Winter Paralympics
Medalists at the 2022 Winter Paralympics
Paralympic athletes of Fiamme Gialle
Paralympic medalists in alpine skiing
21st-century Italian people